Loxostege mucosalis is a species of moth in the family Crambidae. It is found in Bulgaria, the Republic of Macedonia, Ukraine, Turkey and Russia.

References

Moths described in 1848
Pyraustinae
Moths of Europe
Moths of Asia